Paraivongius rufipes is a species of leaf beetle of Ghana and the Democratic Republic of the Congo. It was first described by Julius Weise in 1883.

References

Eumolpinae
Beetles of the Democratic Republic of the Congo
Beetles described in 1883
Taxa named by Julius Weise
Insects of West Africa